Jonathan Eysseric and Quentin Halys were the defending champions but only Halys chose to defend his title, partnering Albano Olivetti. Halys lost in the semifinals to Gong Maoxin and Zhang Ze.

Gong and Zhang won the title after defeating Gonzalo Escobar and Fernando Romboli 2–6, 7–6(7–5), [10–8] in the final.

Seeds

Draw

References
 Main Draw

Guzzini Challenger - Doubles
2018 Doubles